The Sydney Super Cup is a football friendly tournament to be held in Sydney during November 2022. The tournament is being held in the days prior to the 2022 FIFA World Cup whilst domestic leagues are paused. Rangers were originally scheduled to participate alongside Glasgow rivals Celtic, but withdrew on 31 March 2022, replaced by English Premier League side Everton. 

The tournament is expected to be a bi-annual event.

Teams
The teams involved are:

  Sydney FC – A-League Men (host)
  Western Sydney Wanderers – A-League Men (host)
  Celtic – Scottish Premiership
  Everton – Premier League

Venues
 Sydney Football Stadium
 Western Sydney Stadium
 Stadium Australia

Fixtures

References

2022 in Australian soccer
Australian soccer friendly trophies
2022 establishments in Australia
Soccer in Sydney
November 2022 sports events in Australia